6216 San Jose, provisional designation , is a background asteroid from the central regions of the asteroid belt, approximately  in diameter. It was discovered on 30 September 1975, by American astronomer Schelte Bus at the Palomar Observatory. The asteroid was named for the city of San Jose in California.

Orbit and classification 

San Jose is a non-family asteroid from the main belt's background population. It orbits the Sun in the central asteroid belt at a distance of 2.5–3.0 AU once every 4 years and 7 months (1,669 days; semi-major axis of 2.75 AU). Its orbit has an eccentricity of 0.10 and an inclination of 4° with respect to the ecliptic. The body's observation arc begins with a precovery taken at Palomar in April 1954.

Physical characteristics 

San Jose spectral type is unknown. Based on its albedo (see below), it is likely a stony S-type asteroid. It has an absolute magnitude of 13.0.

Diameter and albedo 

According to the survey carried out by the NEOWISE mission of NASA's Wide-field Infrared Survey Explorer, San Jose measures 8.033 kilometers in diameter and its surface has an albedo of 0.208.

Rotation period 

As of 2018, no rotational lightcurve of San Jose has been obtained from photometric observations. The body's rotation period, pole and shape remain unknown.

Naming 

This minor planet was named for the city of San Jose, California, United States, for its long support of nearby Lick Observatory particularly in efforts to reduce light pollution.
The official naming citation was published by the Minor Planet Center on 14 December 1997.

References

External links 
 (6216) San Jose imaged at Lick Observatory
 Dictionary of Minor Planet Names, Google books
 Discovery Circumstances: Numbered Minor Planets (5001)-(10000) – Minor Planet Center
 
 

006216
Discoveries by Schelte J. Bus
Named minor planets
19750930